The Millennium Coastal Path is a  pedestrian walkway and cycleway along the south coast of Carmarthenshire, providing a link between Llanelli and Pembrey Country Park. The cycleway forms a section of both the Celtic Trail cycle route (part of NCN 47) and the National Cycle Network NCN 4.

The Millennium Coastal Path runs through the Millennium Coastal Park. The Millennium Coastal Path may refer specifically to the  cycle and walking path from The Llanelli Discovery Centre to Burry Port and Pembury Forest, and more generally to the  section of the Wales Coast Path through the park from Bynea Gateway to Burry Port.

On the evening of Monday 19 February 2007, a high tide combined with a high storm swell caused severe damage to a section of the path and cycle route near Burry Port. A 440 yards section was damaged with complete loss of a 160 yards section.

References

External links
 British Cycling: The Millenium Coastal Path
 Millennium Coastal Park Website  Including Map of the park, plus places to visit and hotels in the area.

Transport in Carmarthenshire
Cycleways in Wales
Llanelli
Coastal path
Recreational walks in Wales
Coastal paths in Wales
Coast of Carmarthenshire